Ninetology U9Z1+ (I9502) is a high end smartphone with dual SIM capabilities.  It's powered by a MediaTek MT6589 quad-core (1.2 GHz) processor and runs on the Android Jelly Bean 4.2 Operating System.

History

Release
The U9Z1+ was announced during a launch event held at Hilton Kuala Lumpur, Malaysia on the 30th of July, 2013.

Feature

Hardware
The Ninetology U9Z1+ has a dimension of 144.5 mm (H) X 73.0 mm (W) X 9.0 mm (T) and weighs 158 grams. The device is running on a MediaTek MT6589 quad-core 1.2 GHz processor that enables it to have dual SIM capability.  Its Corning Gorilla Glass II screen sits on top of a 5.0-inch capacitive IPS touch screen display with a resolution of 1280 X 720p.

It possesses a 13.0-megapixel rear camera with a F2.2 aperture feature, HDR, face detection feature and continuous shot function, as well as a 5.0 MP front-facing camera.

The battery possesses a capacity of Li-Ion 2000 mAh and can last up to approximately 10 hours of talk time.

Software
The Ninetology U9Z1+ I9502 is running on the Android Jelly Bean Operating System and is pre-loaded with a variety of applications:
 Web: Native Android Browser 
 Social: Facebook, YouTube, WeChat, Google+, Google Hangouts
 Media: Camera, Gallery, FM Radio, Music Player, Video Player, 
 Personal Information Management: Calendar, Detail Contact Information
 Utilities: Calculator, Alarm Clock, Google Maps, News and Weather Application, Voice Recorder, Adobe Reader, NQ Mobile Security, NQ Valut, M Warranty

References

External links
 Official website

Smartphones
Mobile phones introduced in 2013
Android (operating system) devices